Iranian frozen assets in international accounts are calculated to be worth between $100 billion and $120 billion. Almost $2 billion of Iran's assets are frozen in the United States. According to the Congressional Research Service, in addition to the money locked up in foreign bank accounts, Iran's frozen assets include real estate and other property. The estimated value of Iran's real estate in the U.S. and their accumulated rent is $50 million. Besides the assets frozen in the U.S., some parts of Iran's assets are frozen around the world by the United Nations.

As of January 2021, Iran had frozen assets in the following countries: $7 billion in South Korea; $6 billion in Iraq; $20 billion in China; $1.5 billion in Japan; $1.6 billion in Luxembourg.

Background
Iran's assets were first frozen by U.S. president Jimmy Carter in 1979, after revolutionaries overthrew the U.S.-allied Mohammad Reza Shah Pahlavi's administration and took American hostages. After the Iranian Revolution in 1979, the United States ended its economic and diplomatic ties with Iran, banned Iranian oil imports and froze approximately 11 billion 1980-US dollars of its assets.

Many of the assets were then unfrozen in 1981 after the Algiers Accords were signed and the hostage crisis ended. At the time of the 1979 revolution, the Pentagon re-sold some $400 million in Iranian military equipment already paid for by the deposed government, and the money was "placed in an escrow account".

Much of the frozen cash includes Iran's income from selling a limited amount of oil prior to the lifting of the sanctions, when Iran could legally sell oil but could not transfer the money back to Iran, because doing so was illegal under U.S. sanctions.

After nuclear negotiations
Some pages of the JCPOA were dedicated to the listing of individuals and entities whose assets would be unfrozen.
According to Nader Habibi, a professor of economics at Brandeis University, JCPOA will lead to the release of only about $30 billion worth of assets; a similar figure of about $32 billion was estimated by Valiollah Seif, the chief of Iran's central bank.

According to the Washington Institute in 2015: "...the pre-deal asset freeze did not have as great an impact on the Iranian government as some statements from Washington suggested. And going forward, the post-deal relaxation of restrictions will not have as great an impact as some critics of the deal suggest."

The US government also has seized a Manhattan skyscraper belonging to the Iranian government worth over a billion US dollars.

Seizure of Iranian assets

Deborah Peterson and other plaintiffs brought a lawsuit in U.S. federal court against the Islamic Republic of Iran, and obtained a judgments against Iran for its role in the 1983 Beirut barracks bombings (in which 241 U.S. peacekeepers were killed) and for other acts of international terrorism. While foreign states usually enjoy immunity from claims in court, the plaintiffs invoked an exception to the Foreign Sovereign Immunities Act of 1976 that allows foreign states to be held liable for acts of state-sponsored terrorism. The central bank of Iran, Bank Markazi, challenged the execution of the judgment on various grounds. However, in 2012, Congress passed, and President Barack Obama signed, the Iran Threat Reduction and Syria Human Rights Act of 2012, which specified that the judgment in the Peterson et al. v. Islamic Republic of Iran et al. would be subject to execution and also abolished Bank Markazi to the execution of judgment. Bank Markazi challenged this statute as unconstitutional, arguing that Congress had unduly interfered with a judicial function by intervening in a specific case; however, the U.S. Supreme Court, in Bank Markazi v. Peterson, ruled 7-2 that Congress's act was constitutional.

Iran had denied any involvement in any of the bombings. Iranian president Hassan Rouhani called the action "blatant robbery".

Usage of the frozen assets

Since 1980, Iran has demanded that the US, European Union, and South Korea return all of the frozen assets to Iran, but their demands have largely been ignored. Some of the seized assets have been resold to third parties, while many have been given to families of victims of the regime. For example, in October 2020, $1.4 billion of frozen cash were awarded in punitive and compensatory damages to the family of Robert Levinson after his abduction and presumed death.

See also
 Seizure of the Hankuk Chemi
 Sanctions against Iran

References

Sanctions against Iran
Economy of Iran
Foreign relations of Iran
United States economic policy
Anti-Iranian sentiments
International sanctions
Iran–United States relations
Asset